The William Henry Watson Homestead was a historic house on White County Route 68 in Denmark, Arkansas.  It was a single story wood frame dogtrot house, with a side gable roof, weatherboard siding, and a foundation of stone piers.  Originally built with a single pen about 1890, it was extended at some period.

The house was listed on the National Register of Historic Places in 1992.  It has been listed as destroyed in the Arkansas Historic Preservation Program database.

See also
National Register of Historic Places listings in White County, Arkansas

References

Houses on the National Register of Historic Places in Arkansas
Houses in White County, Arkansas
Demolished buildings and structures in Arkansas
National Register of Historic Places in White County, Arkansas
Dogtrot architecture in Arkansas
1890 establishments in Arkansas
Houses completed in 1890